In economics, imperfect competition refers to a situation where the characteristics of an economic market do not fulfil all the necessary conditions of a perfectly competitive market. Imperfect competition will cause market inefficiency when it happens, resulting in market failure. Imperfect competition is a term usually used to describe the seller's position, meaning that the level of competition between sellers falls far short of the level of competition in the market under ideal conditions.

The structure of a market can significantly impact the financial performance and conduct of the firms competing within it. There is a causal relationship between structure, behaviour and performance paradigm. The characteristics of market structure can be measured by evaluating the degree of seller's market concentration to determine the nature of market competition. The degree of market power refers to the firms' ability to affect the price of a good and thus, raise the market price of the good or service above marginal cost (MC). Moreover, market structure can range from perfect competition to a pure monopoly. Monopolistic competition and oligopoly competition are the extreme conditions of market structure. Perfect competition occurs when there is intense price competition, perfect competition is a market situation and competitive outcome that economists use as a benchmark for economic welfare analysis and efficiency. In perfect competition, prices move closer to marginal cost when at least two of the three conditions—that there are many sellers in the market, that there is excess capacity, and that there are homogeneous products.

Conditions of imperfect competition 

If ONE of the following conditions are satisfied within an economic market, the market is considered "imperfect":

 The market's goods and services are heterogeneous or differentiated. This means that firms can charge higher prices as their goods and services are perceived as better;
 The market contains ONE seller or none; 
 There are barriers to market entry and exit. If there are barriers to market entry and exit, there may be special costs to a firm that may prevent or make it difficult for a firm to enter or exit an industry market. Additionally, if prices are different, buyers may not have the ability to easily switch suppliers and thus, suppliers cannot easily exit or enter the market; and 
 Market firms are NOT price takers and hence, have some control over the pricing of their goods and services.

Range of market structures 

There are FOUR broad market structures that result in Imperfect Competition. The table below provides an overview of the characteristics of each of these market structures.

Monopolistic competition 

A situation in which many firms with slightly different products compete. Moreover, firms compete by selling differentiated products that are highly substitutable, but are not perfect substitutes. Therefore, the level of market power under monopolistic competition is contingent on the degree of product differentiation. Monopolistic competition indicates that enterprises will participate in non-price competition.  Monopolistic competition leads to low production efficiency, and the economic profit of monopolistic competition company is 0.  In the long run, consumers suffer if monopolists' profits are limited, because limiting profits prevents companies from innovating.  

Monopolistic competition is defined to describe two main characteristics of a market:

1. There are many sellers in the market. Each vendor assumes that a slight change in the price of his product will not affect the overall market price. The belief that competitors will not change their prices just because a vendor in the market changes the price of a product.

2. The sellers in the market all offer non-homogenous products. Companies have some control over the price of their products. Different types of consumers will buy the goods they like according to their subjective judgment.

There are two types of product differentiation:

 Vertical differentiation: a product is unambiguously better or worse than a competing product (e.g. products that differ in efficiency or effectiveness); Customers select a product by using objective measures (e.g., price and quality) to rank their choices from best to worst. and
 Horizontal differentiation: a product that only some consumers prefer to competing products (e.g. Mercedes Benz and BMW). Customers make subjective choices about what they want to buy, because they have no objective criteria to distinguish the quality of products. Location and taste are important criteria to determine whether they are consumers' special preferences.  

How much consumers know about alternative cost information (search costs) is another measure of level differentiation. Consumers will not easily switch from a fixed seller unless they are informed of another seller who is more in line with their price expectations. Lower search costs can help low-priced sellers increase their market share. The reason for lower level differentiation may be the lower cost of search, which will lead to lower profits for the company. In addition, when customers have different preferences for goods, other sources of supply are unknown to customers, and transportation costs are too high, the possibility of switching is small.

Enterprises entering the monopolistic competition market may realize profit increase or loss in the short term, but will realize normal profit in the long run. Because if the price of the enterprise is high enough to offset the fixed cost above the marginal cost, it will attract the enterprise to enter the market to obtain more profits. Once the enterprise enters the market, it will occupy more market share by lowering the product price until the profit reaches 0. If the firm prices above marginal cost but below fixed cost, the firm loses money and some firms exit. These companies that no longer compete for market share allow those that remain to regain market share and survive.

Furthermore, each firm shares a small percentage of the total monopolistic market and hence, has limited control over the prevailing market price. Thus, each firms' demand curve (unlike perfect competition) is downward sloping, rather than flat. Additionally, cross-price elasticities of demand are large (but not infinite). Production costs are above what may be achieved by perfectly competitive firms, but society benefits from the product differentiation. If the number of enterprises in monopolistic competition industry increases and the degree of product differentiation is weakened, then the enterprise is closer to pure competition. The main difference between monopoly competition and perfect competition lies in the paradox of excess capacity and price exceeding marginal cost.

Oligopoly 

In an oligopoly market structure, the market is supplied by a small number of firms (more than 2). Moreover, there are so few firms that the actions of one firm can influence the actions of the other firms. Due to the small number of sellers in the market, any adjustment of product quantity and pricing by an enterprise will affect its competitors and thus affect the supply and pricing of the whole market. Oligopolies generally rely on non-price weapons, such as advertising or changes in product characteristics. Several large companies hold large market shares in industrial production, each facing a downward sloping demand, and the industry is often characterized by extensive non-price competition. The oligopoly considers price cuts to be a dangerous strategy. Businesses depend on each other. Under this market structure, the differentiation of products may or may not exist. The product they sell may or may not be differentiated and there are barriers to entry: natural, cost, market size,... or dissuasive strategies.

In an oligopoly, barriers to market entry and exit are high. The major barriers are:

 Patents; 
 Technology;
 Economies of scale;
 Government regulation (e.g. limiting the issuance of licences); and 
 Firm name recognition.

The challenges of managing an oligopoly are complex:  

1. Use quantity or price to prevent other enterprises from entering  

2. Observe and assume how your competitors will respond

When the market is in the equilibrium state of oligopoly, for other markets, every company can make the highest profit even if there are competitors. Every company can take into account the measures taken by competitors and assume that competitors will follow the original plan.  The models most commonly used to study oligopoly in the field of economics are Cournot quantity competition and Bertrand price competition.  These two models study and explain how enterprises respond to each other's strategic changes from the perspective of quantity and price respectively. 

Cournot quantity competition starts with the assumption that there are only two firms in the market.  Each firm sets its own production numbers and assumes that all firms make the same plans.  The cost structure is information that is publicly available to all companies, and the company adjusts the amount of production it produces based on what it thinks another company will produce.  The advantage of cournot's quantitative competition model is that price and quantity are between monopoly (low output, high price) and competition (high output, low price).  The two firms produce a stable Nash equilibrium, and neither wants to deviate from it alone.  It has the disadvantage of assuming that the two players each develop a quantitative strategy for their product production, but this is unlikely to happen in practice.  Because when there are only two players in the market, they react strongly to each other's changes in strategy, rather than just guessing and assuming.  

Bertrand price competition assumes that two firms produce the same product and both firms know the market demand curve. Assume a product price and assume that this price will satisfy all product needs. If firms compete on price rather than quantity, the market outcome will be:

--If the goods are the same, the company charges different prices, and the consumer buys only from the company with the lowest price.

-- If goods are similar and companies charge the same price, consumers don't care which company they buy from.

If two firms collude, they form a cartel to reduce output and increase their firms' profitability. Oil companies, grocery stores and some telecommunication companies are examples of oligopolies.

Duopoly 

A special type of Oligopoly, where two firms have exclusive power and control in a market. Both companies produce the same type of product and no other company produces the same or alternative product. The goods produced are circulated in only one market, and no other company intends to enter the market. The two companies have a lot of control over market prices. It is a particular case of oligopoly, so it can be said that it is an intermediate situation between monopoly and perfect competition economy. Hence, it is the most basic form of oligopoly.

Monopoly 

In a monopoly market, there is only one offerer and there is a plurality of buyers; it is a firm with no competitors in its industry. If there is competition, it is mainly some marginal companies in the market, generally accounting for 30-40% of the market share. The decisions of marginal companies will not materially affect the profits of monopolists. The monopolist has market power, that is, it can influence the price of the good. Moreover, a monopoly is the sole provider of a good or service and thus, faces no competition in the output market. Hence, there are significant barriers to market entry, such as, patents, market size, control of some raw material. Examples of monopolies include public utilities (water, electricity) and Australia Post. 
 A monopolist faces a downward sloping demand curve. Thus, as the monopolist raises its price, it sells fewer units. This suggests that when prices rise, even monopolists can drive away customers and sell fewer products. The difference between monopoly and other models is that monopolists can price their products without considering the reactions of other firms' strategic decisions.

Hence, a monopolist's: (If marginal revenue equals marginal cost)

 Output is below the level of a perfectly competitive market; but 
 Price is above marginal cost.

Another feature of monopolies is rent seeking, whereby monopoly firms engage in spending money to maintain and exercise its monopoly power. This is undertaken through advertising, lobbying and building excess capacity to deter competitors from entering the market.

A firm is a monopsonist if it faces small levels, or no competition in ONE of its output markets. A natural monopoly occurs when it is cheaper for a single firm to provide all of the market's output.

Governments often restrict monopolies through high taxes or anti-monopoly laws. Because the high profits obtained by monopolies may harm the interests of consumers. However, restricting the profits of monopolists may also harm the interests of consumers, because companies may create unsatisfied products that are not available in new markets. These products will bring positive benefits to consumers and create huge economic value for enterprises. Tax and antitrust laws can discourage companies from innovating.

Intensity of price competition 

The intensity of price competition is another good measure of how much control a firm within a market structure has over price. The Herfindahl Index provides a measure of firm concentration within a market and is the sum of the squared market shares of all the firms in the market (Herfindahl Index = (Si)2, where Si = market share of firm i) . Large companies are given more weight in the index (unlike the N-concentration ratio). The value of the index ranges from 1/N to 1 (where N is the number of firms in the market). Thus, the more concentrated the market is, the larger the value of the Herfindahl Index will be. The table below provides an overview of price competition and intensity in the four main classes of market structure.

See also
 Perfect competition
 Monopolistic competition
 Oligopoly
 Monopoly
 Monopsony
 Oligopsony
 Duopoly

References 

 Massimiliano Vatiero (2009), "An Institutionalist Explanation of Market Dominances". World Competition. Law and Economics Review, 32(2):221-6.